Kieran McGeary is an Irish Gaelic footballer who plays for the Pomeroy club and the Tyrone county team. Following Tyrone's All-Ireland win in 2021, he was picked by the Sunday Game panel as the footballer of the year.
In December 2021, he won his first All-Star Award and was also named as the All Stars Footballer of the Year.

Honours
Tyrone
 All-Ireland Senior Football Championship (1): 2021 
 Ulster Senior Football Championship (3): 2016, 2017, 2021 
 All-Ireland Under-21 Football Championship (1): 2015 (c)
 Ulster Under-21 Football Championship (1): 2015 (c)
 Ulster Minor Football Championship (1): 2012

Pomeroy
 Ulster Intermediate Club Football Championship (1): 2016
 Tyrone Intermediate Football Championship (1): 2016

St Mary's University College
 Sigerson Cup (1): 2017

Individual 
 All Stars Footballer of the Year (1): 2021
 All Star Award (1): 2021
 The Sunday Game Footballer of the Year (1): 2021
 The Sunday Game Team of the Year (1): 2021

References

Living people
Tyrone inter-county Gaelic footballers
1994 births